Anisodus is a genus of flowering plants in the family Solanaceae.

Habitat
It is native to China, Tibet, India, Bhutan, and Nepal.

Medicinal uses
One species, Anisodus tanguticus, is one of the 50 fundamental herbs used in traditional Chinese medicine.

Species
Anisodus acutangulus C.Y.Wu & C.Chen
Anisodus acutangulus var. acutangulus 
Anisodus acutangulus var. breviflorus C.Y.Wu & C.Chen
Anisodus carniolicoides (C.Y.Wu & C.Chen) D'Arcy & Z.Y.Zhang
Anisodus luridus Link ex Spreng.
Anisodus tanguticus (Maxim.) Pascher

Gallery

References

External links
Anisodus page

Hyoscyameae
Solanaceae genera
Medicinal plants of Asia